Azucena  may refer to:
 Azucena (given name)
 Azucena (surname)
 Azucena (TV series), a Venezuelan telenovela
 Azucena, Louisiana, a community in the United States
 Azucena, a gypsy, character in Verdi's opera Il trovatore
 Asocena, an illegal delicacy in the Northern Philippines made from dog meat
 Azucena (Filipino film), a 2000 Filipino film produced by Reyna Films, inspired by the delicacy asocena
 Azucena, a 2005 Romanian film directed by Mircea Mureșan